Jerusalem is an unincorporated community in Harford County, Maryland, United States.  It is the location of the historic Jerusalem Mill Village and Jericho Covered Bridge, both listed on the National Register of Historic Places. Jerusalem Mill Village is located on Jerusalem Road in Kingsville, MD between the Little Gunpowder Falls river and Jericho Road.

References

Unincorporated communities in Harford County, Maryland
Unincorporated communities in Maryland